Jalen Christopher Neal (born August 24, 2003) is an American professional soccer player who plays as a center-back for Major League Soccer club LA Galaxy.

Club career
Neal joined the LA Galaxy Academy in 2016, appearing in the former U.S. Soccer Development Academy system before graduating to the club's USL Championship affiliate LA Galaxy II in 2020. After making his professional debut on July 11 in a 4–0 defeat to Phoenix Rising, he would make 13 total league appearances for the club, scoring his first goal in the final match of the season against Reno 1868. Owing to his community outreach efforts, he was named the team's Humanitarian of the Year.

On January 20, 2021, Neal signed with LA Galaxy. He made his competitive debut for the club in May 2022, making a late substitute appearance in the club's U.S. Open Cup victory over California United Strikers.

International career
In November 2021, Neal was named to the United States national under-20 team for the 2021 Revelations Cup. Neal received his maiden call up to the senior national team for the 2023 January camp. He made his debut on January 25 in a 2–1 friendly defeat to Serbia.

Career statistics

International

Honors
United States U20
CONCACAF U-20 Championship: 2022

Individual
CONCACAF U-20 Championship Best XI: 2022

References

External links
Jalen Neal at US Soccer Development Academy

2003 births
Living people
American soccer players
United States men's under-20 international soccer players
LA Galaxy players
LA Galaxy II players
People from Lakewood, California
Association football defenders
Homegrown Players (MLS)
Soccer players from California
Sportspeople from Los Angeles County, California
USL Championship players
United States men's international soccer players